Lachnocnema, commonly called woolly legs, is a genus of butterflies in the family Lycaenidae found mainly in Sub-Saharan Africa. Identification requires dissection to reveal subtle genital distinctions.

Species
Listed alphabetically within species groups:
Lachnocnema bibulus group
Lachnocnema bibulus (Fabricius, 1793) – common woolly legs
Lachnocnema kiellandi Libert, 1996
Lachnocnema laches (Fabricius, 1793) – southern pied woolly legs
Lachnocnema pseudobibulus Libert, 1996
Lachnocnema riftensis Libert, 1996
Lachnocnema sosia Libert, 1996
Lachnocnema durbani group
Lachnocnema durbani Trimen, 1887 – D'Urban's woolly legs
Lachnocnema intermedia Libert, 1996
Lachnocnema tanzaniensis Libert, 1996
Lachnocnema abyssinica group
Lachnocnema abyssinica Libert, 1996
Lachnocnema angolanus Libert, 1996
Lachnocnema ducarmei Libert, 1996
Lachnocnema triangularis Libert, 1996
Lachnocnema jacksoni group
Lachnocnema jacksoni Stempffer, 1967
Lachnocnema emperamus group
Lachnocnema bamptoni Libert, 1996
Lachnocnema brimoides Libert, 1996
Lachnocnema divergens Gaede, 1915 – divergent woolly legs
Lachnocnema dohertyi Libert, 1996
Lachnocnema emperamus (Snellen, 1872) – common woolly legs or western woolly legs
Lachnocnema katangae Libert, 1996
Lachnocnema obscura Libert, 1996
Lachnocnema overlaeti Libert, 1996
Lachnocnema regularis (Libert, 1996) – regular woolly legs
Lachnocnema vuattouxi Libert, 1996 – western woolly legs
Lachnocnema reutlingeri group
Lachnocnema albimacula Libert, 1996 - Libert's large woolly legs
Lachnocnema brunea Libert, 1996
Lachnocnema jolyana Libert, 1996
Lachnocnema luna Druce, 1910 – Druce's large woolly legs
Lachnocnema magna Aurivillius, 1895 – large woolly legs
Lachnocnema nigrocellularis Libert, 1996
Lachnocnema reutlingeri Holland, 1892 – Reutlinger's large woolly legs
Lachnocnema exiguus group
Lachnocnema exiguus Holland, 1890 – white woolly legs
Species group unknown
Lachnocnema congoensis Libert, 1996
Lachnocnema disrupta Talbot, 1935 – toothed white woolly legs
Lachnocnema inexpectata Libert, 1996
Lachnocnema unicolor Libert, 1996

References

Libert, M. (1996a) Contribution a l'etude des Lycaenidae africains. Revision du genre Lachnocnema Trimen, (Lepidoptera Lycaenidae). Lambillionea 96 (1):185-202.
Libert, M. (1996b) Contribution a l'etude des Lycaenidae africains: revision du genre Lachnocnema Trimen, deuxieme partie (1). (Lepidoptera Lycaenidae). Lambillionea 96 (2):367-386.
Libert, M. (1996c) Contribution a l'etude des Lycaenidae africains: revision du genre Lachnocnema Trimen, troisieme partie. (Lepidoptera Lycaenidae). Lambillionea 96 (3):479-500.
Seitz, A. Die Gross-Schmetterlinge der Erde 13: Die Afrikanischen Tagfalter. Plate XIII 65

Lycaenidae genera
Miletinae
Taxa named by Roland Trimen